Tretya Karta is a rural locality (a settlement) in Kirovskoye Rural Settlement, Sredneakhtubinsky District, Volgograd Oblast, Russia. The population was 483 as of 2010. There are 16 streets.

Geography 
Tretya Karta is located near the Pakhotny Erik, 19 km northwest of Srednyaya Akhtuba (the district's administrative centre) by road. Kuybyshev is the nearest rural locality.

References 

Rural localities in Sredneakhtubinsky District